Papin is an unincorporated community in Jefferson County, in the U.S. state of Missouri.

The community has the name of the local Papin family.

References

Unincorporated communities in Jefferson County, Missouri
Unincorporated communities in Missouri